Hanni-Mari Autere (also known as Hanni Autere) is a Finnish fiddle-singer, folk singer, and musician. She is a member of Loituma. Autere has become known for the singing freestyle in the song Ievan polkka as a part of Loituma music group which has later become known as a Leekspin girl meme.

Career 
Hanni is a versatile musician who enjoys numerous roles in the field of art. She graduated with a doctorate in music in 2011 from the folk music subject group of the Sibelius Academy.

Discography

Albums

References

1969 births
Living people
Finnish folk singers
Finnish violinists
Place of birth missing (living people)